The 2019 Boston Uprising season was the second season of Boston Uprising's existence in the Overwatch League.

The team finished the season with an 8–20 record – a far cry from their 26–14 record from 2018. A 3–2 victory over the Dallas Fuel in the final match of Stage 1 gave the Uprising a 4–3 record and qualified them for the Stage 1 Playoffs. However, they were eliminated in the quarterfinals after a 0–3 loss to the Vancouver Titans. Boston struggled to repeat the success they found in Stage 1, only winning four of their next fourteen matches before the implementation of an enforced 2-2-2 role lock by the league. The Uprising did not perform well under the new format, as a 0–4 loss to the Atlanta Reign on August 25 gave Boston a winless 0–7 Stage 4 record.

Preceding offseason

Player re-signings 
From August 1 to September 9, 2018, all Overwatch League teams that competed in the 2018 season could choose to extend their team's players' contracts. Uprising released four of their ten players – tied with Los Angeles Gladiators for the most in the league by a playoff team – in Shin "Kalios" Woo-yeol, Connor "Avast" Prince, Mikias "Snow" Yohannes, and Stanislav "Mistakes" Danilov.

Free agency 
Boston's first offseason acquisition was on October 22, when Uprising signed DPS player Jeffrey "blasé" Tsang from Overwatch Contenders team Gladiators Legion. On October 27, it was announced that flex support player Park "Neko" Seh-yeon had been signed to new expansion team Toronto Defiant. The team promoted Kelsey "ColourHex" Birse and Minseob "Axxiom" Park from their academy team Toronto Esports three days later. On November 4, Uprising signed main tank Cameron "Fusions" Bosworth, who had just recently competed in the 2018 Overwatch World Cup for team UK, on a two-way contract with Toronto Esports. On December 3, Uprising transferred Kwon "Striker" Nam-joo to San Francisco Shock. Two day later, the team signed Renan "alemao" Moretto, the first Brazilian player to sign to an Overwatch League roster. The team's final offseason transaction occurred on February 12, two days before the beginning of the regular season, when Uprising transferred main tank Noh "Gamsu" Young-jin to Shanghai Dragons.

Regular season 

Boston opened their season on February 14 with a match against the New York Excelsior; Boston lost the match 2–1 loss. The Uprising's next match was against the Houston Outlaws three days later. Main tank Cameron "Fusions" Bosworth performed solidly in the match, as the team took a 3–2 victory. The following week, Boston lost to the Shanghai Dragons by a 1–3 score, giving the Dragon's their first-ever franchise victory. Boston clinched the sixth, and final, seed of the Stage 1 Playoffs. The Uprising faced the top-seeded Vancouver Titans in the Stage 1 Quarterfinals on March 21. They did not win a single map against the Titans, losing the match 0–3.

Two days prior to Boston's first match of Stage 2, the Uprising signed support player Zion "Persia" Yang, who had most recently played for Talon Epsorts of Overwatch Contenders Pacific. On the same day, Boston traded flex tank Lucas "NotE" Meissner to the Dallas Fuel in exchange for flex tank Richard "rCk" Kanerva. Boston failed to claim a Stage 2 playoff berth.

In Stage 3, the Uprising went on a season-high 6-game losing streak, which was snapped on June 23 with a 3–2 win over the Paris Eternal. The team ended Stage 3 with a 1–6 record.

Prior to the start of Stage 4, which would debut the League's enforcement of a 2-2-2 role lock, the Uprising acquired  DPS Lee "Stellar" Do-hyung, who had retired earlier in the season, from the Toronto Defiant. The team did not fare well with the new change, losing all seven of their matches in Stage 4.

Final roster

Transactions 
Transactions of/for players on the roster during the 2019 regular season:
On April 2, Uprising signed Yang "Persia" Zi-on.
On April 2, Uprising traded Richard "rCk" Kanerva to Dallas Fuel in exchange for Lucas "NotE" Meissner.
On July 15, Uprising acquired Lee "Stellar" Do-hyung from Toronto Defiant.

Standings

Record by stage

League

Game log

Regular season

Awards 
On May 1, Cameron "Fusions" Bosworth was named as a starter for the 2019 Overwatch League All-Star Game.

References 

2019 Overwatch League seasons by team
Boston Uprising
Boston Uprising seasons